Eastmoreland Hospital was a 100-bed medical center in Portland, Oregon, United States. Closed in January 2004 along with sister hospital Woodland Park, the facility was purchased by Reed College and torn down.

History
Eastmoreland Hospital was established in the 1940s. In 1987, the hospital opened an osteopathic family practice residency for osteopathic physicians. Located in southeast Portland, the hospital was bought by Symphony Healthcare in 2002. They also auctioned off everything inside the hospital that year. After acquiring the property, Reed College leveled the buildings.

References

Defunct hospitals in Oregon
Hospitals in Portland, Oregon
Demolished buildings and structures in Portland, Oregon
Osteopathic medicine
1940s establishments in Oregon
2004 disestablishments in Oregon
Hospitals disestablished in 2004
Reed College